The Aerial Lift Bridge, earlier known as the Aerial Bridge or Aerial Ferry Bridge, is a landmark in the port city of Duluth, Minnesota. The span began life in 1905 as the United States' first transporter bridge: Only one other was ever constructed in the country, Sky Ride in Chicago. The span was converted in 1929–1930 to a vertical-lift bridge, also rather uncommon, although there are six such bridges along Ontario's Welland Canal. It remains in operation. The bridge is owned and operated by the City of Duluth. The bridge was added to the National Register of Historic Places on May 22, 1973. The United States Army Corps of Engineers maintains a nearby maritime museum.

Bridge history 
The bridge spans the Duluth Ship Canal, which was put through the miles-long sand spit named Minnesota Point – commonly called Park Point by locals – in 1870–1871. The natural mouth of the Saint Louis River is about  farther southeast, and is split between Minnesota and Wisconsin. Creating this gap in the sand spit  meant that residents who lived on the new island needed to have a way to get across. Several transportation methods were tried, though they were complicated by the weather.  Ferries could work in the summer, but ice caused problems in colder months. A swinging footbridge was used, but was considered rather rickety and unsafe.

In 1892, a contest was held to find a solution. The winning design came from John Low Waddell, who drew up plans for a high-rise vertical lift bridge. However, the War Department objected to the design, and the project was canceled before it could be built. Waddell's design went on to be built in Chicago, Illinois, as the slightly larger South Halsted Street Bridge, which was removed in 1932.

New plans were later drawn up for a structure that would ferry people from one side to the other. This type of span, known variously as an aerial transfer, ferry, or transporter bridge, was first demonstrated in Bilbao's Vizcaya Bridge in 1893 and one in France in 1898. Duluth's bridge was inspired by the one in France, though the actual construction is quite different. The architect was a city engineer, Thomas McGilvray.

When it was completed in 1905, the Aerial Bridge's gondola had a capacity of 60 short tons (54 tonnes) and could carry 350 people plus wagons, streetcars, or automobiles. A trip across the canal took about one minute, and the ferry car moved across once every five minutes during busy times of the day. A growing population on Minnesota Point, a greater demand for cars, and an increase in tourism soon meant that the bridge's capacity was being stretched to the limit.

A remodeling was planned that would remove the gondola and incorporate a lifting platform into the structure. The firm finally commissioned with designing the new bridge was the descendant of Waddell's company. The new design, which closely resembles the 1892 concept, is attributed to C.A.P. Turner. Reconstruction began in 1929. In order to ensure that tall ships could still pass under the bridge, the top span had to be raised to accommodate the new deck when raised. The support columns on either side were also modified so that they could hold new counterweights to balance the weight of the lifting portion. The new bridge first lifted for a vessel, the U.S. Army Corps of Engineers tugboat Essayons, on March 29, 1930.

The bridge can be raised to its full height of 135 feet in about a minute, and is raised about 5,000 times per year. As ships pass, there is a customary horn-blowing sequence that is copied back. The bridge's "horn" is actually made up of two Westinghouse Airbrake locomotive horns. Long-short-short is known as the Captain's Salute and is the most common of the ship signal exchanges. The exchange is known as the master salute consisting of the horn sequence of long-long-long-short-short.

The bridge was designated as a National Historic Civil Engineering Landmark by the American Society of Civil Engineers in 2017.

Gallery

See also 
 List of bridges documented by the Historic American Engineering Record in Minnesota
 Transporter bridge – other similar bridges in the world
 Tees Newport Bridge
 John A. Blatnik Bridge – the nearby Interstate 535 crossing in Duluth–Superior
 Richard I. Bong Memorial Bridge – the nearby U.S. Route 2 crossing
 Sky Ride – the other ferry bridge built in the U.S. as an exhibit at the 1933–1934 World's Fair, "Century of Progress," in Chicago
 Stillwater Bridge (St. Croix River) – another lift bridge in Minnesota, connecting to Wisconsin

References

External links

Transporter bridges
Vertical lift bridges in Minnesota
Buildings and structures in Duluth, Minnesota
Road bridges on the National Register of Historic Places in Minnesota
Transportation in Duluth, Minnesota
Bridges completed in 1905
Bridges completed in 1930
Drawbridges on the National Register of Historic Places
Historic American Engineering Record in Minnesota
National Register of Historic Places in St. Louis County, Minnesota
1905 establishments in Minnesota
Historic Civil Engineering Landmarks
Duluth, Minnesota